Mats Patrik Torbjörn Jönsson (born 16 October 1972) is a Swedish politician and member of the Riksdag for the Sweden Democrats party.

Jönsson worked as a civil servant for the Swedish Transport Administration in traffic management. Since October 2014, he has been a councilor in Skåne. and was elected to the Riksdag in the 2014 Swedish general election for the Sweden Democrats. In parliament, he sits on the Transport and Justice Committees.

References 

Living people
1972 births
Members of the Riksdag from the Sweden Democrats
Members of the Riksdag 2014–2018
Members of the Riksdag 2018–2022
People from Hässleholm Municipality
Members of the Riksdag 2022–2026